Khagrachari is a district in the Chittagong Division of Southeastern Bangladesh. It is a part of the Chittagong Hill Tracts region.

History
The Chittagong Hill Tracts was under the reign of the Tripura State, the Arakans & the Sultans in different times before it came under the control of the British East India Company in 1760. Although the British got the authority of the Chittagong Hill Tracts in 1760, they had no authority besides collecting nominal taxes. Until 1860, two kings or chiefs governed the internal administration of this region. In 1860, another circle was formed in present Khagrachari zila, inhabited by the Tripura population. The chief or the Raja of this circle was selected from the minority Marma population. The circle was named after the Tripura dialect the Mun Circle, but later, the 'Mun dialect', was changed and renamed as Mong Circle. In 1900 the British offered independent status to Chittagong Hill Tracts recognizing the culture and language of the hill tracts population. But during the Partition of India, this status was abolished and became part of East Bengal, ruled under Pakistan. Then, the name of this subdivision was Ramgarh with its headquarters at Khagrachari. It was upgraded to zila in 1983. The zila headquarters is located on the bank of the 'Chengi' stream (meaning Chhara in local language) which was full of Catkin plants (meaning Khagra in local language). It is believed that the zila might have derived its name from the above two words 'Khagra' and 'Chhara'. Khagrachari Local Govt. Council was established on 6 March 1989 to uphold the political, social, cultural, educational and economic right and to expedite the process of socio-economic development of all residents of Khagrachari Hill District. According to 'Peace Accord' this council was renamed as “Khagrachari Hill District Council (KHDC)” by the Act-10 of 1998. Now this council has been regarded as the main focal point of administration as well as development activities of the district.

Geography
Khagrachari is a hilly area. It is bounded by Tripura state of India on the north and west, Rangamati district to the east and Chittagong District to the southwest. Notable hill ranges are Golamoon, Chotto Panchari, Karmi Mura, Lutiban, Kuradia, Bhanga Mura, Jopisil.

It has three rivers, namely Chengi, Feni and Maini. Chengi is the longest river in Khagrahhari. The main ethnic groups living in the district are Tripuris, Chakmas, Bengalis and Marmas.

Demographics

According to the 2011 Bangladesh census, Khagrachhari district had a population was 613,917, of which 313,793 were males and 300,124 females. Rural population was 398,109 (64.85%) while the urban population was 215,808 (35.15%). Khagrachhari district had a literacy rate of 46.11% for the population 7 years and above: 51.88% for males and 40.07% for females.

As per the 2011 Census, there were a total of 316,987 (51.63%) indigenous people in the district. Indigenous communities such as Tripuri (Tripura), Rakhaine, Chakma, Marma and Tanchangya belong to this zilla.

Religious composition 

Source

Subdivisions
Upazilas under this district are:
 Dighinala Upazila
 Khagrachhari Sadar Upazila
 Lakshmichhari Upazila
 Mahalchhari Upazila
 Manikchhari Upazila
 Matiranga Upazila
 Panchhari Upazila
 Ramgarh Upazila
 Guimara Upazila

Administration
Khagrachhari district consist of 3 Paurashava, 9 Upazila/Thana, 38 Union, 122 Mauza, 27 Ward, 153 Mahalla and 1,702 Villages. The upazilas are Dighinala, Khagrachhari Sadar, 
Lakshmichhari, Mahalchhari, Manikchhari, Matiranga, Panchhari, Ramgarh and Guimara.

Deputy Commissioner (DC): Protap Chandro Biswas

Chairman of Hill District Council: Mr. Kongjari Chowdhury

Economy
Most of the people live on Jhum cultivation. There are also people of various professions like teacher, farmer and businessmen. Tourism is becoming a strong income source for the local.

Main sources of income Agriculture 59.92%, non-agricultural labourer 9.33%, industry 0.44%, commerce 10.67%, transport and communication 1.11%, service 7.94%, construction 0.92%, religious service 0.24%, rent and remittance 0.37% and others 9.06%.

Education

Literacy rate (7+ year) 46.1%; male 51.9%, female 40.1%. Rate of school going student is 83%. There are 18 colleges, 71 high schools, 13 madrasa and different kinds of educational institutions.

Noted educational institutions:

 Khagrachhari Government College (1974)
 Matiranga Degree College (1992)
 Tabalchari Greenhill College (2009)
 Ramgarh Government Degree College (1980)
 Panchhari College (1990)
 Dighinala Government College
 Khagrachhri Cantonmet public school and college (2006),
 Panchhari High School and College (1981)
 Khagrachhari Government High School (1957)
 Tabalchhari Kadamtoli High School (1952)
 Matiranga Pailot High school
 Gomti B.K High school
 Santipur High School
 Amtoli High school
 Taindong High School
 Matiranga Girls High School
 Khadachora High School
 Bornal Moktizodha High School
 Matiranga  Reacidencial High School
 Ramgarh Government High School (1952)
 Rani Nihar Devi Government High School (1976)
 Dighinala Government High School
 Choto Merung High School (1975)
 Thakurchara High School (1979)
 Khagrachhari North Khobongpodia Government Primary School (1905)

Archaeological heritage and relics
Among the archaeological heritages and relics, Rajbari of the Mong Circle and Dighi (large pond) of Dighinala (excavated by Gobinda Manikya Bahadur exiled king of Tripura) are notable.

Transport

Palanquin, elephant cart, buffalo cart, horse carriage, bullock cart and country boat were the traditional transports once found in the rural area of the zila. These means of transport are either extinct or nearly extinct except country boat. Now-a-days, all the upazilas are connected to the zila headquarters by metalled roads. Bus, minibus, three wheelers, pickup van ply over the zila. Chander Gari (local four wheeled jeep) is a popular transport used to ply in the hill area of the zila.

Climate
Temperature and Rainfall: The annual average temperature of the zila varies from maximum 34.6 °C to minimum 13 °C and the average annual rainfall is 3031 mm.

Member of Parliament

Khagrachhari Seat 298: Kujendra Laal Tripura (from Awami League). Before Kujendra Lal Tripura, Jotindra Lal Tripura and then Wadud Bhuiyan was the Member of Parliament of Khagrachhari Seat 298. He was also the Chairman of the Chittagong Hill Tracts Development Board at that period. Wadud Bhuiyan was two times MP.A.K.M alim Ullah was two times MP

Notable persons
Birendra Kishore Roaza
Kujendra Lal Tripura
Naba Bikram Kishore Tripura
Jotindra Lal Tripura
Basanti Chakma
Wadud Bhuiyan
Mathura Bikash Tripura

See also
 Postal Codes
 Alutila Cave
 Matai Hakor
 Matai Pukhiri
 Tuari Mairang
 Mayung Kopal
 Palashpur
 Districts of Bangladesh
 Tripuri people
 Chakma people
 Marma people

Notes

References

External links

 Kagrachhari District mapped on OpenStreetMap, retrieved 29 December 2021.
 Chittagong Hill Tracts mapped on OpenStreetMap, retrieved 29 December 2021. (inset are its three districts: Khagrachhari, Rangamaai, and Bandarban)

 
Districts of Chittagong Division
Districts of Bangladesh
Chittagong Hill Tracts conflict